Naomi Alejandra Soazo Boccardo (born 19 December 1988) is a visually impaired Venezuelan judoka. She competed in a number of international events, such as the International Blind Sports Federation World Championships, but is best known for being the only Venezuelan, in any sport, to have won a gold medal at the Paralympic Games.

She made her Paralympic Games début at the 2008 Summer Paralympics in Beijing, in the women's up to 63 kg category. Defeating Zhou Qian of China by ippon within less than a minute in her first match, she then defeated Sweden's Elvira Kivi by waza-ari-awasete-ippon in the semifinal. In the final, it took her just three seconds to defeat Spain's completely blind Marta Arce by ippon and win Venezuela's first ever Paralympic gold medal.

At the 2012 Paralympics Soazo lost her first bout to the eventual gold medalist, but continued competing through repechage, and lost a bronze medal match to Daniele Bernardes Milan. At the 2016 Paralympics Soazo won a bronze medal in the 70 kg category.

Notes

References

External links

 
 

1988 births
Living people
Venezuelan female judoka
Venezuelan people of Japanese descent
Paralympic judoka of Venezuela
Paralympic gold medalists for Venezuela
Paralympic bronze medalists for Venezuela
Paralympic medalists in judo
Judoka at the 2008 Summer Paralympics
Judoka at the 2012 Summer Paralympics
Judoka at the 2016 Summer Paralympics
Medalists at the 2008 Summer Paralympics
Medalists at the 2016 Summer Paralympics
Medalists at the 2015 Parapan American Games
Universidad Santa María (Venezuela) alumni
Visually impaired category Paralympic competitors
21st-century Venezuelan women
Venezuelan people with disabilities